Agir, officially Agir, la droite constructive, was a political party in France, established on 26 November 2017. The majority of its founding members were previously associated with the Constructive faction within the centre-right Republicans. Styling itself as a "liberal, social, European, humanist and reformist" party, Agir was founded by a group of 19 established politicians as an alternative to the Republicans. The party merged with Renaissance in 2022.

Agir Members of Parliament (MPs) were members of the Agir ensemble parliamentary group in the National Assembly. Fabienne Keller was the party's only Member of the European Parliament (MEP).

History

Formation
Following the defeat of Les Républicains candidate François Fillon in the first round of the 2017 French presidential election and the ascension of Laurent Wauquiez, perceived as coming from the right wing of Les Républicains, to the leadership of the party, 19 politicians from LR and the center-right Union of Democrats and Independents formed the group.

Coalition 
Agir was part of the Ensemble Citoyens coalition, which supports President Emmanuel Macron for the 2022 French presidential election.

Ideology
Agir was identified as part of centre-right politics, defining itself as pro-European, liberal and humanist, and rejecting the "identity, authoritarian, eurosceptic and ultra-conservative" right.

Prominent members

Party leaders

Deputies
Agir had 12 Members of Parliament in the 15th assembly. In the 2022 French legislative election, 6 were elected as part of the Ensemble Citoyens coalition.

15th National Assembly of France

16th National Assembly of France 

 Olivier Becht
 Paul Christophe
 Thomas Gassilloud
 Franck Riester
 Charles Rodwell
 Charles Sitzenstuhl
 Lionel Vuibert

Senators
Agir has 6 Senators.

MEP 

 Fabienne Keller

Election results

European Parliament

References

Centre-right parties in Europe
Political parties in France
Political parties established in 2017
Political parties disestablished in 2022
Pro-European political parties in France
Political parties of the French Fifth Republic
2017 establishments in France